Adama Sawadogo (born 20 January 1990) is a Burkinabé international footballer who plays for Salitas, as a goalkeeper.

Career
Born in Ouahigouya, Sawadogo has played club football for ASFA Yennenga, Missile FC, FC 105 Libreville and Salitas.

He made his international debut for Burkina Faso in 2009, and was selected for the 2012 Africa Cup of Nations.

References

External links
Adama Sawadogo at Footballdatabase

1990 births
Living people
Burkinabé footballers
Burkina Faso international footballers
ASFA Yennenga players
Missile FC players
FC 105 Libreville players
Salitas FC players
US des Forces Armées players
Association football goalkeepers
2012 Africa Cup of Nations players
Burkinabé expatriate footballers
Burkinabé expatriate sportspeople in Gabon
Expatriate footballers in Gabon
21st-century Burkinabé people
Burkina Faso A' international footballers
2018 African Nations Championship players